Chandra Shekhar Sahu is an Indian politician and member of the Bharatiya Janata Party. Sahu was a member of the Lok Sabha from the Mahasamund (Lok Sabha constituency) in Mahasamund district of Chhattisgarh.

References 

Living people
India MPs 1996–1997
Bharatiya Janata Party politicians from Chhattisgarh
Madhya Pradesh MLAs 1998–2003
21st-century Indian politicians
Lok Sabha members from Chhattisgarh
Year of birth missing (living people)
People from Mahasamund district